Mittal Champions Trust (2005 to 2014) was a trust which supported Indian athletes with world-beating potential. It was funded by Lakshmi Mittal and was initiated by his son-in-law Amit Bhatia.

It was founded on 9 November 2005 by Mahesh Bhupathi. The first beneficiary was Joshna Chinappa, India's best squash player. The trust was formed due to Mittal being disappointed by the dismal performance by Indians, who won just one bronze medal in the 1996 Summer Olympics, another bronze in the 2000 Summer Olympics and a silver medal in the 2004 Summer Olympics. The initial funding is $9 million. The trust developed Indian athletes for the 2012 Olympics in London.

The sports focused on were Squash, Badminton, Archery, Boxing, Shooting sports, Swimming and Heptathlon. The foundation did not support cricket.

Players supported
Mittal Champions Trust has 40 athletes as of now. They had supported Abhinav Bindra when he had problem in importing ammunition. 
The trust supported Abhinav with 50 lacs. MCT also plans to develop training facilities in the country.

Boxing
 Akhil Kumar
 Jitender Kumar
 Dinesh Kumar

Shooting
 Abhinav Bindra
 Anjali Bhagwat
 Ronjan Sodhi
 Suma Shirur
 Heena Sidhu

Swimming
 Virdhawal Khade

Wrestling
 Yogeshwar Dutt
 Naveen Singh Suhag
 Palwinder Singh Cheema
 Mosaum khatri

Archery
 Bombayla Devi
 Mangal Singh Champia

Squash
 Dipika Pallikal
 Joshna Chinappa

Athletics
 Krishna Poonia

Sailing
 Nitin Mongia

Awards
L N Mittal announced a 1.5 crore cash award for Abhinav Bindra for winning the gold medal in Olympics.

References

External links
Mittal Champions Trust website

See also 
 Tata Sporting Samaritan
 Olympic Gold Quest

Sports organisations of India
Mittal family